Thompson Township is a civil township of Schoolcraft County in the U.S. state of Michigan. As of the 2010 census, the township had a total population of 795.

History 
After the timber boom of the late 19th century, Thompson Township's chief assets included second-growth trees such as balsam and aspen.  The schooner Rouse Simmons, loaded with balsam Christmas trees, left Thompson Harbor for Chicago in November, 1912.  The schooner sank with all hands off Two Rivers, Wisconsin, becoming one of the most famous shipwrecks in Lake Michigan history.

Geography 

Thompson Township has a shoreline on Indian Lake and Lake Michigan, as well as containing portions of the Hiawatha National Forest.  Palms Book State Park and Indian Lake State Park are also located within the township.  Major roadways include U.S. Route 2, M-94, and M-149.

Demographics 
As of the census of 2000, there were 671 people, 278 households, and 219 families living in the township. The population density was 5.9 per square mile (2.3/km). There were 608 housing units at an average density of 5.4 per square mile (2.1/km). The racial makeup of the township was 87.93% White, 0.30% African-American, 9.54% Native American, 0.15% Asian, 0.30% from other races, and 1.79% from two or more races.  Hispanic or Latino of any race were 0.30% of the population.

There were 278 households, out of which 26.3% had children under the age of 18 living with them, 71.9% were married couples living together, 3.6% had a female householder with no husband present, and 21.2% were non-families. 16.9% of all households were made up of individuals, and 8.3% had someone living alone who was 65 years of age or older. The average household size was 2.41 and the average family size was 2.68.

In the township the population was spread out, with 19.8% under the age of 18, 5.7% from 18 to 24, 23.0% from 25 to 44, 34.1% from 45 to 64, and 17.4% who were 65 years of age or older. The median age was 46 years. For every 100 females, there were 100.3 males. For every 100 females age 18 and over, there were 103.0 males.

The median income for a household in the township was $38,750, and the median income for a family was $41,731. Males had a median income of $41,250 versus $26,500 for females. The per capita income for the township was $24,045. About 7.5% of families and 8.8% of the population were below the poverty line, including 7.3% of those under the age of 18 and 3.8% of those 65 and older.

Transportation
Indian Trails provides daily intercity bus service via Thompson between St. Ignace and Ironwood, Michigan.

References

Townships in Schoolcraft County, Michigan
Townships in Michigan
Michigan populated places on Lake Michigan
Populated places established in 1882
1882 establishments in Michigan